Manley & Associates was an independent video game developer founded in 1982, which developed over 70 titles for video game publishers, including Electronic Arts, Activision, Disney, GameTek, Publishing International, and Spectrum HoloByte. Many of the company's early titles were one or two person projects created in founder Ivan Manley's house, but eventually it grew to roughly 60 people working from an office park in Issaquah, Washington. Hometown U.S.A. (Publishing International) won the Software Publishers' Association's award for the Best Creativity Program, Educational Category, 1988.

In the mid-1990s, Manley & Associates did a number of ports for Electronic Arts and was subsequently acquired by EA in 1996. Explaining the decision to sell the company to EA, Ivan Manley said that in order to invest in newer technologies, Manley & Associates had to either become a publisher or merge with an established publisher. The studio was relocated to neighboring Bellevue, Washington and renamed Electronic Arts Seattle. EA Seattle closed in 2002.

Games developed

Design & implementation
Hometown U.S.A. (MS-DOS, Macintosh, Apple II, Apple IIGS, C64, Amiga, FMTowns)
Pharaoh's Revenge (Apple II, C64, MS-DOS)
The Third Courier
Home Alone (Amiga, MS-DOS)
 Lost in New York (MS-DOS)
Are We There Yet? (MS-DOS)
Super Conflict (SNES)
The Wizard of Oz (SNES)
Pink Goes to Hollywood (SNES)
An American Tail: The Computer Adventures of Fievel and His Friends (MS-DOS)
DinoPark Tycoon (MS-DOS, Macintosh, 3DO)
Wolf (MS-DOS)
King Arthur & the Knights of Justice (SNES)
Lion (MS-DOS)

Implementation only
Paperboy 2 (Game Gear), port
Ninja Gaiden II: The Dark Sword of Chaos (Amiga, MS-DOS), port
WildSnake (SNES), designed externally
Xenocide (MS-DOS), port

As EA Seattle
The Need for Speed: Special Edition (1996, MS-DOS, Windows)
Need for Speed II: Special Edition (1997, Windows)
Need for Speed III: Hot Pursuit (1998, Windows)
Need for Speed: High Stakes (1999, Windows)
Motor City Online (2001, Windows)
Need for Speed: Hot Pursuit 2 (2002, Windows, Game Cube, Xbox)

References

Video game companies established in 1982
Video game companies disestablished in 1996
Defunct companies based in Washington (state)
Electronic Arts
Organizations based in Issaquah, Washington
Defunct video game companies of the United States
Video game development companies
1982 establishments in Washington (state)
1996 disestablishments in Washington (state)
1996 mergers and acquisitions